Western Hotel may refer to:

in the United States (by state)

Western Hotel (Glenwood Springs, Colorado)
Western Hotel (Ouray, Colorado)
Western Hotel (Holy Cross, Iowa), listed on the NRHP in Iowa
Western Hotel (Lynchburg, Virginia), listed on the NRHP in Virginia
Western Hotel (Lancaster, California), listed as a California Historical Landmark
Western Hotel (Sacramento), listed as a California Historical Landmark